Paul Robeson: Here I Stand is a comprehensive and award-winning documentary film that explores the life and career of Paul Robeson, the legendary African-American athlete-actor-singer-activist. It was directed by St. Clair Bourne for the PBS series American Masters. Spanning Robeson's whole life, it features interviews with Robeson himself, his son Paul Robeson Jr. and others close to its subject, celebrities, and several scholars on African-American cinema. It also includes extensive excerpts from Robeson's movies and musical recordings.

Cast
 Ossie Davis (narrator)
 Paul Robeson
 Harry Belafonte
 Howard Fast
 Paul Robeson, Jr.
 Martin Duberman
 David Levering Lewis
 Uta Hagen

See also
Here I Stand (1958 book)

Notes

Resources
Ehrlich, Scott. Paul Robeson. Los Angeles: Melrose Square, 1988. Print.
Ellis, Jack C., and Betsy A. McLane. A New History of Documentary Film. New York: Continuum, 2005. Print.
Hamilton, Virginia. Paul Robeson: The Life and Times of a Free Black Man. New York: HarperCollins, 1974. Print.

External links
 
Paul Robeson: Here I Stand at WorldCat
American Masters: Paul Robeson including full interviews

Works about Paul Robeson
Documentary films about singers
Documentary films about actors
1990s English-language films